Evans Russ Mensah (born 25 July 1988) is a former Ghanaian football player. He played for New Radiant SC, a Dhivehi League team in Maldives. He played his academy football in Ghana and South Africa. He was the top scorer for his academy teams; he played both in Ghana and South Africa. From academy he went straight to Ghana premier league, scoring twice on his debut for Okwahu United. He caught the eyes of many teams, which took him to Malaysia to Perlis F.C for his first international trials. He came to Ghana to continue his career and later landed a big contract in Thailand Premiere League. His speed, pace and skills made him break into the first team. He was awarded players player of his team on his first season in the Thai Premieer League

References

1988 births
Ghanaian footballers
Expatriate footballers in Thailand
Living people
Ghanaian expatriate sportspeople in Thailand
New Radiant S.C. players
Footballers from Kumasi
Association football forwards